Charnelle Marie Bjelkengren (born 1975) is an American lawyer who has served as a judge of the Spokane County Superior Court since 2019. She is a nominee to serve as a United States district judge of the United States District Court for the Eastern District of Washington.

Education 

Bjelkengren received a Bachelor of Arts from Mankato State University (now Minnesota State University), cum laude, in 1997 and a Juris Doctor from Gonzaga University School of Law in 2000.

Career 

From 2001 to 2003 and from 2004 to 2013, Bjelkengren served as an assistant attorney general in the Washington State Attorney General's office. From 2013 to 2019, she served as an administrative law judge for Washington State's Office of Administrative Hearings. Since 2019, she has served as a judge on the Spokane County Superior Court.

Nomination to district court 

On September 2, 2022, President Joe Biden announced his intent to nominate Bjelkengren to serve as a United States district judge of the United States District Court for the Eastern District of Washington. On September 19, 2022, his nomination was sent to the Senate. President Biden nominated Bjelkengren to the seat vacated by Judge Salvador Mendoza Jr., who was elevated to the United States Court of Appeals for the Ninth Circuit on September 16, 2022. On January 3, 2023, her nomination was returned to the president under Rule XXXI, Paragraph 6 of the United States Senate. She was renominated on January 23, 2023. On January 25, 2023, a hearing on her nomination was held before the Senate Judiciary Committee. During her confirmation hearing, Bjelkengren could not answer questions from Senator John Kennedy about the functions of Article V and II of the United States Constitution. Her nomination is pending before the Senate Judiciary Committee. If confirmed, Bjelkengren would be the first woman of color to serve on the United States District Court for the Eastern District of Washington and the first Black woman to serve on a United States District Court in the state of Washington.

References 

1975 births
Living people
20th-century American women lawyers
20th-century American lawyers
21st-century American women lawyers
21st-century American lawyers
21st-century American judges
21st-century American women judges
African-American judges
African-American lawyers
Gonzaga University School of Law alumni
Minnesota State University, Mankato alumni
People from Great Lakes, Illinois
Superior court judges in the United States